The number of national daily newspapers in Luxembourg was five both in 1950 and in 1965. Until 2001 there were six dailies and it became eight when two more dailies were launched. This is a list of newspapers published in Luxembourg.

List of newspapers

Defunct newspapers
Der Kampf
Journal de la ville et du Grand-Duché de Luxembourg
La Clef du cabinet des princes de l'Europe
Luxemburger Volksblatt (1880–87)
Luxemburger Volksblatt (1901–02)
Luxemburger Volksblatt (1933–41)
Luxemburger Wochenblatt
Obermosel-Zeitung
De Peck-Villchen
Der Proletarier (1919)
La Voix du Luxembourg
D'Ro'd Wullmaus

References

Luxembourg
Newspapers in Luxembourg

de:Liste von Zeitungen#Luxemburg